Fred Wellington Bowen (May 23, 1877 in Newcastle, Ontario, Canada – July 7, 1949) was a Canadian politician and farmer. He was elected to the House of Commons of Canada in 1921 as a Member of the historical Conservative Party to represent the riding of Durham. He was re-elected in the elections of 1925, 1926, 1930 but defeated in 1935. Prior to his federal career, he was reeve and councillor of Clarke Township, Ontario.

Electoral record

External links
 

1877 births
1949 deaths
Conservative Party of Canada (1867–1942) MPs
Members of the House of Commons of Canada from Ontario